Sardauna Memorial Stadium is a multi-use stadium in Gusau, Zamfara State, Nigeria. It is currently used mostly for football matches and is the home stadium of Zamfara United F.C. of the Nigerian Premier League. The stadium has a capacity of 5,000 people.

References

Football venues in Nigeria